Boondh is the second album by the Pakistani pop/rock band Jal, released on 14 December 2007, three years after the release of the band's debut Aadat. The first single from the album, "Sajni", was a major hit all over Pakistan.

Singles 
Singles from the album were "Sajni", "Moré Piya", "Yeh Mera Pakistan", "Main Mast Hoon", "Humein Itna Pyaar"  and "Chalte Chalte".

Track listing

Personnel
All information is taken from the CD.

Jal
 Farhan Saeed – lead vocals
 Goher Mumtaz – lead guitar, backing vocals
 Aamir Sheraz – bass guitar

Additional musicians
 Ali Mustafa – keyboards
 John "Gumby" Louis Pinto – drums and percussion
 Salman Albert – bass

Production
Produced by Mekaal Hasan
Recorded and mixed at Digital Fidelity Studios, Lahore, Punjab
Guitar sound engineer – Mekaal Hasan and Goher Mumtaz
Assisted by Mekaal Hasan

Awards and nominations
Awarded for Best Album of the Year at the 7th Lux Style Awards in 2008.

References

External links
 Official Website

2007 albums
Jal (band) albums
Urdu-language albums